The World 10K Bengaluru (known as the TCS World 10K Bengaluru for sponsorship reasons  by Tata Consultancy Services (TCS)) is an annual 10 kilometres road running competition which takes place in Bangalore, India. The competition was first held in 2008 and usually takes place in late May. The first three editions were sponsored by Sunfeast (ITC Limited).

The race, which is certified by AIMS-certified, begins and ends at the Sree Kanteerava Stadium, after looping through the roads of Bangalore. The different race categories at the event are – World 10K (participation restricted to International and National athletes), Open 10K (participation open to amateur runners), Majja Run (a 5.7 km run meant for fun runners), Senior Citizens’ Run (a 4.2 km run for Senior Citizens), and the Champions with Disability event (a 4.2 km event for persons with disability). In addition to this there also is a 10 km Corporate Champions category in which companies can field a team of 3 members and compete to achieve the best aggregate time.

The event is organised by Procam International, a sport and leisure management firm which is also responsible for the Mumbai Marathon and Delhi Half Marathon. There is a total prize pot of US$170,000 and race winners receive over $21,000 for their victories. Further significant prizes are offered to the best Indian competitors and teams.

The 8th edition was held on 17 May 2015 with French Sprinter Marie Jose Perec as its event ambassador.

The 9th edition was held on 15 May 2016 with track and field athlete Mike Powell as its event ambassador.

Past winners

Key:

References

External links
Official website
TCS World 10K Official Registration Link

10K runs
Athletics competitions in India
Recurring sporting events established in 2008
Sports competitions in Bangalore
Annual sporting events in India
2008 establishments in Karnataka